ThunderJaws is a run and gun video game released in arcades by Atari Games in 1990. Home ports by Domark were published in 1991.

Plot
A secret agent is on a mission to stop the mad mutation experiments of deranged Madame Q, but is required to venture through the aquatic laboratories and bases to find and eliminate her.

Gameplay

The platforming game has two types of gameplay throughout each stage. The first is an underwater zone, where the player dives and swims through the level and looks for an exit to reach the other type of gameplay; the base zone, where the player walks and jumps across platforms (similar to Rolling Thunder) until an important destination is reached.

The player is armed with a speargun to eliminate enemies but can acquire better weapons with limited ammo either found on the ground or randomly from an enemy killed. Enemies consist of divers, mutants and robots. At the end of various levels, the player is faced with a boss, defeated by repeatedly shooting its weak points.

Reception

References

External links

ThunderJaws for the Atari ST at Atari Mania
ThunderJaws at Lemon Amiga

1990 video games
Amiga games
Amstrad CPC games
Arcade video games
Atari arcade games
Atari ST games
Cancelled ZX Spectrum games
Commodore 64 games
Platform games
Science fiction video games
Spy video games
Video games scored by Brad Fuller
Video games developed in the United States
Domark games
Multiplayer and single-player video games